"Shower the People" is the opening track on James Taylor's 1976 album In the Pocket.

Reception
Cash Box said that the song is "a meaningful ballad that will pick up a lot of FM airplay" said that it has "a way with melody and phrasing" similar to other Taylor songs. Record Worldsaid that "This midtempo offering is bolstered by a great singalong chorus."

Personnel
James Taylor – lead vocals, harmony vocals, acoustic guitars
Carly Simon – harmony vocals
Danny Kortchmar – electric guitars
Leland Sklar – bass guitar
Russ Kunkel – drums, percussion
Victor Feldman – orchestral bells, vibes
Clarence McDonald – Fender Rhodes, hornorgan
Nick DeCaro – hornorgan, voiceorgan

Chart performance
"Shower the People" reached #22 on the Billboard Hot 100 chart in the U.S. that fall, remaining in the Top 40 for eight weeks. It also topped the Easy Listening chart for one week, Taylor's third song to do so, following 1971's "You've Got a Friend" and 1975's "How Sweet It Is (To Be Loved by You)".

In Canada, the song fell short of the Pop Top 40, however, it did reach number one on the Adult Contemporary chart.

Covers
Christian rock singer Mylon LeFevre covered the song with his band Broken Heart on their 1990 album Crank It Up. Released as a single, their version peaked at number 4 on CCM Magazine Christian AC and Christian CHR charts.

See also
List of number-one adult contemporary singles of 1976 (U.S.)

References

External links
 

1976 singles
James Taylor songs
Glen Campbell songs
Songs written by James Taylor
1976 songs
Song recordings produced by Lenny Waronker
Song recordings produced by Russ Titelman
Warner Records singles